General Sir Jeremy John George Mackenzie,  (born 11 February 1941) is a retired senior British Army officer who served as Deputy Supreme Allied Commander Europe from 1994 to 1998.

Early life
Mackenzie was born on 11 February 1941 in Nairobi, Kenya, the son of Lieutenant Colonel John W.E. Mackenzie of the Seaforth Highlanders. He was educated at the Duke of York School, Nairobi and the Royal Military Academy Sandhurst.

Military career
Mackenzie was commissioned into the Queen’s Own Highlanders in July 1961, and posted to the 1st Battalion in Singapore. He took part in putting down the Brunei Rebellion in 1962 and later served in a training capacity with the SAS. He was appointed Commanding Officer of the 1st Battalion in 1980. After graduating from the Staff College, Camberley, he was made a Company Commander with the Argyll and Sutherland Highlanders in Northern Ireland and Brigade Major of the 24th Airportable Brigade. He was then second-in-command of the Queen’s Own Highlanders in South Armagh, being obliged to take command when the commanding officer was killed in the Warrenpoint ambush of 1979.

In 1980/81 he commanded the 1st Battalion Queen's Own Highlanders in Hong Kong and was appointed an Officer of the Order of the British Empire. He then spent a few years as an instructor at the Army Staff College, Camberley and served on the Staff at the Ministry of Defence as a colonel. In 1984 he was promoted brigadier and made Commander of the 12th Armoured Brigade and, from March 1989, Commandant of the Staff College, Camberley. He then was made major general and General Officer Commanding 4th Armoured Division in December 1989, and on 2 December 1991 appointed the last Commander of 1st (British) Corps with the acting rank of lieutenant general. He was knighted as a Knight Commander of the Order of the Bath in December 1991.

In 1992 he formed the Allied Command Europe Rapid Reaction Corps and became its first Commander. In 1994 he was promoted full general in 1994 and given the post of Deputy Supreme Allied Commander Europe with special responsibility for the Partnership for Peace Program and the Expansion of NATO, and responsible for coordinating 52,000 troops from 34 nations who moved into Bosnia and Herzegovina. He was also given the colonelcy of the Highlanders (Seaforth, Gordons and Camerons) from 1994 to 2001.

He was made a Knight Grand Cross of the Order of the Bath in 1999, having previously been awarded the US Legion of Merit twice in 1997 and 1999, the Czech Republic's Cross of Merit First Class, and the Officer's Cross of the Order of Merit of the Republic of Hungary in 1998. He was also an Aide de Camp General to the Queen from 1992 to 1996, Governor of the Royal Hospital Chelsea from August 1999 to September 2006, and a Deputy Lieutenant of Greater London. He retired from the army in 1999.

Retirement
In retirement Mackenzie became chairman of UK Gear (a footwear manufacturer), and chairman of AC Cars (a car manufacturer). He also became a director of Blue Hackle (a security business).

Private life
He married Elizabeth Lyon (née Wertenbaker) and has a son and a daughter.

References

|-

|-
 

|-
 

|-

|-

 

1941 births
Academics of the Staff College, Camberley
British Army generals
Deputy Lieutenants of Greater London
Knights Grand Cross of the Order of the Bath
Officers of the Order of the British Empire
Queen's Own Highlanders officers
Living people
NATO military personnel
Commandants of the Staff College, Camberley
Alumni of Lenana School
Graduates of the Staff College, Camberley